ethio telecom, previously known as the Ethiopian Telecommunications Corporation (ETC), is an Ethiopian  telecommunication company serving as the major internet and telephone service provider. Ethio telecom is owned by the Ethiopian government and maintains a monopoly over all telecommunication services in Ethiopia. Based in Addis Ababa, it is one of the "Big-5" group of state owned corporations in Ethiopia, along with Ethiopian Airlines, the Commercial Bank of Ethiopia, Ethiopian Insurance Corporation, and the Ethiopian Shipping Lines. 
  
Ethio telecom was managed, on a management contract arrangement from 2010 to 2013, by France Télécom, and was required to comply with Ethiopian government orders. The government said it outsourced the management as ETC was not able to meet the demands of the fast-growing country. It also said that telecommunications services would not be privatized, at least not in the near future. Ethio telecom generates a revenue of over US$300 million for the Ethiopian government, and was dubbed a "cash cow" by the previous Prime Minister Hailemariam Desalegn.

History 

Originally a division of the Ministry of Post, Telephone and Telegraph, what would become the ETC was established as the Imperial Board of Telecommunications of Ethiopia (IBTE) by proclamation No. 131/52 in 1952. Under the Derg regime, the IBTE was reorganized as the Ethiopian telecommunications service in October 1975, which was in turn reorganized in January 1981 as the Ethiopian Telecommunications Authority. In November 1996, the Ethiopian Telecommunications Authority became ETC by Council of Ministers regulation No. 10/1996. The subsequent Proclamation 49/1996 expanded the ETC's duties and responsibilities. For its international traffic links and communication services, ETC mainly uses its earth station at Sululta which transmits and receives to both the Indian Ocean and the Atlantic Ocean satellites. Engineering consulting firm Arup, were involved in the design and engineering of the early tower structures (during the 1970s).

In late 2006, the ETC signed an agreement worth US$1.5 billion with three Chinese companies, ZTE Corporation, Huawei Technologies and the Chinese International Telecommunication Construction Corporation, to upgrade and expand Ethiopian telecommunications services.  This agreement will increase the number of mobile services from 1.5 million to 7 million, land line telephone services from 1 million to 4 million, and expansion of the fibre optic network, from the present 4,000 kilometers to 10,000 by 2010. It is part of a larger US$2.4 billion plan by the Ethiopian government to improve the country's telecommunications infrastructure. In 2018, the mobile service business has reached 85% of the country. In February 2018, it was reported that Ethio telecom had 64.4 million subscribers making it the largest telecommunication services operator in the continent. The operator runs three terrestrial fiber optic cables with a capacity of 42 Gbit/s to connect Ethiopia to the rest of the world via Kenya, Djibouti and Sudan. In August 2019, the company announced that it will install 4G network before other telecom companies enter the Ethiopian market since the government decided that it will liberalize the telecom sector.

Frehiwot Tamru serving as the current Chief Executive Officer since 1 August 2018 preceded by Andualem Admassie who served five years. Frehiwot previously worked as Deputy CEO for Internal Support Service for then Ethiopian Telecommunication Corporation. She told Capital that she managed all surveillance quality protocols.

By 26 August 2020, Ethio telecom planned to extended 842 new infrastructure site during 2020 fiscal year. This infrastructure expected to enable the company to host additional 5.2 million new customers. During this fiscal year, the company planned to generate 55.5 billion birr in revenue, a 16pc growth from the last fiscal year. It also plans to boost the country's telecom density to 51.3%. At the end of financial year 2021/22 it generated a revenue of 61.3 billion birr and boosted the country's telecom density to 63.3% after total subscribers reached 66.59 million birr.

In May 2021, Ethio telecom launched Telebirr, a mobile service platform. Frehiwot said 21.8 million users signed up with this service, making total transaction of 30.3 birr. On 10 May 2022, Ethio telecom commenced 5G network for pre-commercial sale in partnership of Huawei Technology after several months upgrading the predecessor 4G network.

Censorship

According to reports by the OpenNet Initiative and Freedom House, the Ethiopian government through Ethio telecom imposes nationwide, politically motivated internet filtering. Under a 2012 law regulating the telecommunication industry, attempts by journalists to circumvent Ethio telecom surveillance and censorship of the internet could be interpreted as a criminal offense carrying a prison sentence of up to 15 years.

Most blocked sites are those run by Ethiopians in the diaspora who are highly critical of the government, however, Ethio telecom has also intermittently blocked access to other sites. In 2008, the Committee to Protect Journalists site was blocked for several months after it reported the arrest and beating of the editor-in-chief of The Reporter. For almost two years following the 2005 elections, Ethio telecom, which is also the sole telephone provider in the country, blocked mobile phone text-messaging. The government accused the Coalition for Unity and Democracy, the largest electoral opposition at the time, of coordinating anti-government demonstrations using text messages. Ethio telecom resumed messaging service in September 2007.

See also
 Telecommunications in Ethiopia

References

External links
 GSM coverage

1952 establishments in Ethiopia
Government-owned companies of Ethiopia
Companies based in Addis Ababa
Telecommunications companies of Ethiopia